Fincastle Historic District is a national historic district located at Fincastle, Botetourt County, Virginia. It encompasses nine contributing buildings in the central business district of Fincastle.  The district resources portray an excellent example of a typical small 19th century town.  The buildings include examples of Late Victorian, Greek Revival, and Gothic Revival styles.  Notable buildings include the Botetourt County Courthouse (1845, rebuilt 1970) and jail, Methodist Church, Presbyterian Church, St. Mark's Episcopal Church (1837), the Peck House, Selander House (c. 1800), Ammen House (c. 1826), and Kyle House (1832).

It was listed on the National Register of Historic Places in 1969.

References

External links

Fincastle Presbyterian Church, 108 East Back Street, Fincastle, Botetourt County, VA: 1 photo and 1 photo caption page at Historic American Buildings Survey
Saint Mark's Episcopal Church, 111 South Roanoke Street, Fincastle, Botetourt County, VA: 1 photo and 1 photo caption page at Historic American Buildings Survey

Historic districts on the National Register of Historic Places in Virginia
Greek Revival architecture in Virginia
Gothic Revival architecture in Virginia
Victorian architecture in Virginia
Geography of Botetourt County, Virginia
National Register of Historic Places in Botetourt County, Virginia